Eup or EUP may refer to:

Places 
 Eup (administrative division), a level of administrative division found in North Korea and South Korea
 Eup, Haute-Garonne, a commune in France
 Eastern Upper Peninsula of Michigan

Government and politics 
 Economic Union Party, a former political party in the Dominion of Newfoundland
 European Union Parliament, now known as European Parliament
 Europe United Party, a pan-European federal political party
 European Union Politics, a scholarly journal

University presses 
 Edinburgh University Press, in Scotland
 Ewha Womans University Press, in Seoul, South Korea

Other uses 
 Edmonds Underwater Park, a scuba diving site in Seattle, Washington
 Enterprise Unified Process, a software development process
 Energy-using products, the predecessor of Energy-related products